Musti may refer to:

Places and jurisdictions 
 Musti (Tunisia), a historical city and bishopric, presently a Catholic titular see, in northern Tunisia
 Musti in Numidia, also called Musti Numidiae, a historical city and bishopric, presently a Catholic titular see, in modern Algeria

Fiction 
 Musti (character), a cartoon character created by Flemish graphic artist Ray Goossens in 1969
 Musti (TV series), a television series based on the character Musti

Other 
 Popular name for the 95 S 58-61 recoilless weapon in the Finnish Army
 Popular nickname for Mustafa